Daria Kasatkina defeated Shelby Rogers in the final, 6–7(2–7), 6–1, 6–2 to win the singles tennis title at the 2022 Silicon Valley Classic. With the win, Kasatkina re-entered the world's Top 10 in rankings for the first time since 2019, reaching a new career high of No. 9.

Danielle Collins was the reigning champion, but withdrew before the tournament.

Seeds
The top four seeds received a bye into the second round.

Draw

Finals

Top half

Bottom half

Qualifying

Seeds

Qualifiers

Lucky losers

Qualifying draw

First qualifier

Second qualifier

Third qualifier

Fourth qualifier

References

External links
 Main draw
 Qualifying draw

Silicon Valley Classic - Singles
2022 Singles